Bogusław Kaczyński (May 2, 1942 – January 21, 2016) was a Polish classical music journalist, music critic and writer.

Kaczyński was the author of a classical recording series, The Golden Collection. He also hosted musical competitions, including the Frederic Chopin Piano Competition, the Henryk Wieniawski Violin Competition, and the New Year's Concerts in Vienna.

Polityka magazine, ranked Kaczyński among the ten greatest Polish television personalities of the 20th century. Film critic Zygmunt Kałużyński said Kaczyński for opera, as an art form, did more than anybody in the country's whole history. Among others, he won Wiktor and Superwiktor awards. Kaczyński was the founder of the charity foundation ORFEO, which supports Polish culture.

Kaczyński had suffered a stroke in 2007. In 2016, he suffered another stroke and died in Warsaw, aged 73.

References

External links
 Bogusław Kaczyński – Homepage
 Warszawa. Bogusław Kaczyński kończy 65 lat – e-teatr.pl

Polish music theorists
Polish music critics
1942 births
2016 deaths

Recipients of the Gold Medal for Merit to Culture – Gloria Artis
Commanders of the Order of Polonia Restituta